The Dovžan Gorge Formation is a geologic formation in Slovenia. It preserves fossils dating back to the Permian period. The formation is named after the Dovžan Gorge.

Fossil content 
The following fossils have been reported from the formation:
Trilobites
 Ditomopyge aff. kumpani
 Paraphillipsia aff. taurica
 Pseudophillipsia (Carniphillipsia) aff. caruancensis
 Neoproetus sp.
 Pseudophillipsia sp.
Brachiopods
 Capillomesolobus heritschi

References

Bibliography 
 
 

Geologic formations of Slovenia
Permian System of Europe
Asselian
Limestone formations
Reef deposits
Permian southern paleotropical deposits
Paleontology in Slovenia